FK Morava Ćuprija is a football club based in Ćuprija, Serbia. They compete in the Zone League West, the fourth tier of the national league system.

History
The club participated in the Second League of Serbia and Montenegro in the 2003–04 season, but suffered relegation to the Serbian League East. After winning the Pomoravlje-Timok Zone League in the 2011–12 season, they were promoted back to the Serbian League East.

Honours
Serbian League Timok (Tier 3)
 2002–03
Pomoravlje-Timok Zone League (Tier 4)
 2011–12
Pomoravlje District League (Tier 5)
 2015–16

References

External links
 Club page at Srbijasport

1918 establishments in Serbia
Association football clubs established in 1918
Football clubs in Serbia